Vashnam-e Dari (also Romanized as Vashnām-e Darī; also known as Vashnām) is a village in Kambel-e Soleyman Rural District, in the Central District of Chabahar County, Sistan and Baluchestan Province, Iran. At the 2006 census, its population was 399 in 85 families.

References 

Populated places in Chabahar County